= Vehicle registration plates of Mauritius =

Mauritius requires its residents to register their motor vehicles and display vehicle registration plates.

Image	First issued	Design	Slogan	Serial format	Serials issued	Notes
